Peter G. Barnes (August 31, 1945 – May 3, 2018) was an American football linebacker who played professionally in the American Football League (AFL) and the National Football League (NFL). He played college football at Southern University.  He played professionally in the AFL for the Houston Oilers in 1967 and 1968, and the San Diego Chargers in 1969. He then played in the NFL for the Chargers (1970–72), the St. Louis Cardinals (1973–75), and the New England Patriots (1976–77). He was the father of Arizona women's basketball coach Adia Barnes.

Peter died May 3, 2018, in Tucson hospice care after suffering from Alzheimer's disease. He was 72 years old.

See also
List of American Football League players

References

1945 births
2018 deaths
People from DeSoto Parish, Louisiana
Players of American football from Louisiana
Southern Jaguars football players
Houston Oilers players
San Diego Chargers players
St. Louis Cardinals (football) players
New England Patriots players
American Football League players
National College Baseball Hall of Fame inductees